Jordan Boys (born 10 November 1997 in Albury) is a racing driver from Australia. He competed in 4 seasons in the Super2 Series for Image Racing. Jordan will debut in the S5000 Australian Drivers' Championship series at Sydney Motorsport Park with 88 Racing in November 2021.

Career results

Karting career summary

Circuit racing career

Super2 Series results
(key) (Race results only)

Supercars Championship results

Complete Bathurst 1000 results

Complete S5000 results

References

External references
Jordan Boys V8 Supercars Official Profile
Driver Database profile
Profile on Racing Reference

Australian racing drivers
1997 births
Living people
Supercars Championship drivers
Sportspeople from Albury
Racing drivers from New South Wales
Tasman Series drivers
Garry Rogers Motorsport drivers